Sa Talaiassa, also known as Sa Talaia or Sa Talaia de Sant Josep, is the highest mountain on the island of Ibiza in the Balearic Islands of Spain. It is located in the southwest of the island. Talaia, the name of the mountain, means "watchtower" in Catalan, Talaiassa referring to an especially large one.

Sant Josep de sa Talaia, the island's largest municipality, is named after this mountain.

Aviation Accident

In 1972, an Iberia Caravelle airliner crashed into Sa Talaiassa, killing all 104 people on board.

See also
Ibiza (Eivissa)

References

External links

Ajuntament de Sant Josep de sa Talaia
Catástrofe aérea en Ibiza 7 enero 1972
Mountains and hills of Ibiza